R Microscopii is a star in the constellation Microscopium. It is a red giant star of spectral type M4e that is also a Mira variable, with an apparent magnitude ranging between 8.3 and 13.8 over 138 days. Located around  1000 light-years distant, it shines with a luminosity 444 times that of the Sun and has a surface temperature of 3141 K. The Astronomical Society of Southern Africa in 2003 reported that observations of R Microscopii were urgently needed as data on its light curve was incomplete.

References

Microscopium
M-type giants
Mira variables
Microscopii, R
Emission-line stars
196717
101985
CD-29 17235